Mak Ho Wai (7 January 1946 – 14 April 2022) was a Hong Kong / Singaporean television artiste with TVB and then Mediacorp.

Early life and education 
Mak studied at the National Taiwan Ocean University, receiving a bachelor's degree in electronic engineering. He later earned a master's degree in Chinese language studies at the Beijing Normal University at the age of 60.

Career 
After graduating from National Taiwan Ocean University, Mak was a radio DJ in Taiwan a period of time. Having spent ten years in Taiwan, he was proficient in speaking standard Mandarin.

Mak enrolled into the twelfth cohort of the TVB artiste training class in 1982 to fulfil the wishes of his younger brother, who was also an actor with TVB. Mak Dai Shing died in the CAAC Flight 3303 accident in the same year. After completing the training course, he was retained by TVB as an actor, playing mostly a support role in numerous televised drama in the ensuing years.

In September 1994, he moved to Singapore to further his career. 

In 1996, Mak played the patriarch of the family featured in the Chinese drama series, Don't Worry Be Happy. As the drama was popular, with about 68,000 viewers tuning in for its first episode, and 75,000 viewers for its third episode, Mak would gain the moniker, "Old Hero" (老 Hero) for the rest of his life, which was referenced throughout the series.

On 5 October 1997, Mak received the Top 10 Most Popular Male Artistes at the Star Awards. Barely a week later, Mak was part of the Singapore's stage production of Hu-Du-Men (虎度门) that ran between 10 and 14 October. The play was first staged in Hong Kong in the 80s, and it later was adapted into the 1996 Hong Kong film, Hu-Du-Men.

In 2005, Mak had a cameo role in the television series, Destiny, which was the final television role in his acting career.

In 2018, it was reported that Mak had volunteered to be a docent at the National Museum of Singapore.

Personal life 
Mak had two daughters.

When Mak moved to Singapore to further his career in September 1994, he brought along his entire family. Previously while still under contract with TVB, he had expressed that he would like to migrate to Singapore due to the living environment and the education system. On 25 May 1997, Mak received his Singapore citizenship.

Mak died on 14 April 2022 in Singapore.

Filmography

Awards 
 Star Awards for Top 10 Most Popular Male Artistes - 1997

References

External links

Mak Hiu-Wai at Hkmdb

1946 births
2022 deaths
Singaporean male television actors
Hong Kong male television actors
Hong Kong male film actors
Hong Kong television presenters
Hong Kong emigrants to Singapore
National Taiwan Ocean University alumni
Beijing Normal University alumni